Tisovec (or Theissholcz, Latin: Taxovia) is a town in central Slovakia. Its population is around 4,000.

Location and landscape 

Tisovec is situated in the valley of the river Rimava, at the foot of the Muránska planina plateau. The landscape there gives the impression of a small town in the mountains. Some other towns close to it are Brezno, Hnúšťa and Revúca.

History 

The first settlement in the area dates all the way to the Bronze Age. The first written evidence of the town comes from the year 1334 during the reign of King Charles I of Hungary as Tizolc.

The name "Tisovec" comes from the yew tree (in Hungarian "tiszafa", in Slovak "tis"), which can be found in the hills around the town. Tisovec received its charter as a town at the end of the 15th century. The development of the town was halted by raids of the Ottoman Turks in the 16th and 17th centuries. The town's renaissance came in 1780, when Maria Theresia renewed its market privileges.

Demographics 
According to the 2001 census, the town had 4,215 inhabitants. 95.75% of inhabitants were Slovaks, 2.87% Roma, 0.78% Czechs and 0.43% Hungarians. The religious makeup was 34.59% people with no religious affiliation,  32.91% Lutherans and 29.54% Roman Catholics.

Economy 

Nowadays, there are two major employers in the town.

The Calmit company owns the local mine and produces lime. History of the mine goes all the way back to 1870.

CSM Tisovec is a machine building company with 530 employees and annual turnover of 0.5 billion Korunas. The company produces special extensions for trucks which enable them to work in severe conditions or build on the number of jobs that a particular truck can do. The company exports its products to several countries.

A Paper mill and the clothing industry have had a history in the town as well, although they are dying out due to globalization.

The town has touristic potential for its proximity to Muránska planina mountain karst. Also, the mineral water spring is worth mentioning.

Education 

Besides the Vladimír Clementis Elementary School, there are two secondary education schools in Tisovec. An "industrial school" (technical college) founded in 1953 is able to board more students than it currently does. The Lutheran Gymnasium Tisovec, founded in 1992, The Lutheran Gymnasium is perceived to be among the better high schools in Slovakia. It is mostly a boarding school and has approximately 300 students

Twin towns — sister cities
Tisovec is twinned with:

  Putnok, Hungary
  Ludgeřovice, Czech Republic
  Nowy Żmigród, Poland
  Shenandoah, Iowa, United States

Famous people 
Vladimír Clementis (1902–1952), Communist journalist, politician and a founder of the magazine DAV. Clementis was sentenced to death by Communists as a part of the cleansing in the bloody 1950s.
Pavol Jozeffy (1775–1848), was a leading personality in the Gemer area during the revolution era of 1848–1849 and later. He was a town priest and became a bishop in 1823. He also defended Ľudovít Štúr in his fight to sustain a department of Slovak language and literature at the Evangelical lycee in Bratislava.
Štefan Marko Daxner, politician and lawyer, one of the most significant persons in 19th-century Slovak history.
Terézia Vansová, a writer from the era of realism. She lived in Tisovec for more than 30 years and wrote some of her important pieces there. She also propagated women's emancipation.
Ladislav Záborský (1921–2016), a painter, book illustrator, and church artist (stained glass windows in 25 churches and 21 "Stations of the Cross") was born in Tisovec; due to his Christian activities became a political prisoner and lived in Martin.
Tim Flakoll, Senator from North Dakota was among the volunteers who helped remodel and build the Christian Gymnasium in the early 1990s.

References

External links 
 
 

Cities and towns in Slovakia